Laxmi Giri (born 19 January 1955) is a veteran Nepali actress whose career spans more than 35 years. She worked on stage, television and in feature films of Nepali, Newari, Maithili, Tamang and Bhojpuri languages. She appeared in more than 150 feature films, over 600 television programs (including six "mega–serials") and nearly 20 advertisements. 

She started to work in television in 2042 BS, immediately after the establishment of Nepal Television. Her most notable stage role was in MaHa Jodi's Bigyapan, performing in at least 289 performances nationally and internationally, including in 35 different states in the United States, 3 countries in the United Kingdom, as well as Hong Kong and India. Her first television role was in the series April First.

Early life 
She was born in Devpatan, Kathmandu on 19 January 1955 (6 Magh 2011 BS) to Ujeli Adhikari and her husband Muktinath Paudel. Her birth name (given by the priest in the religious naming ceremony) is Nutan Kumari, and she was nicknamed "Bhabu", short for "Bhawani" as a child. Her father died when she was one year old. Her grandmother Dev Kumari Paudel was the first nurse to serve in Palpa District, and one of only 18 nurses, the first Nepali nurses who graduated in 2018 BS. She went to school in Pashupati Pathshala, now Sharada Secondary School. She passed SLC in 2029 BS but did not continue her studies. 

She started acting at age 11, as a child actor in stage performances in Pashupati.

She was employed at Nepal Rastra Bank for 16 years, before she resigned to pursue acting full-time. Her family was not appreciative of her choice to leave a secure government job to pursue a career in acting.

Notable works 
Her notable films include Simana, Thuldai, Darpan Chhaya, Jhola, Kusume Rumal 2, Prem Geet, Pheri Bhetaula, Teen Ghumti, Captain, Rato Tika Nidharma, Dream Girl, Chhakka Panja 2, Chhakka Panja 3, Kirtipur and Pareni Maya Jalaima.

Awards 
She won Best Supporting Actress at the second NFDC National Film Awards in 2014 for her role in Jhola. She won Best Character Actress at the Film Actor's Association of Nepal (FAAN) Awards - 2072 for her role in the film Prem Geet in 2072 BS. She received the FAAN National Award in 2073 BS.

References

1955 births
People from Kathmandu
Khas people
Living people
Actors from Kathmandu
Nepalese child actresses
Nepalese film actresses
Nepalese television actresses
Actresses in Nepali cinema
Actresses in Nepali television
Nepali film award winners
21st-century Nepalese actresses
20th-century Nepalese actresses